Monsters of Legend is the sixteenth studio album by the gothic horror instrumental band, Midnight Syndicate.  Advertised as a tribute to the Golden Age of Horror, the packaging featured images from Universal Classic Monster films Bride of Frankenstein, Werewolf of London, and Dracula.  The album featured the blend of dark orchestral music, sound effects, and audio storytelling that the band had become known for.

Background and album information 
In a 2013, interview with Scary Monsters Magazine, composer, Edward Douglas said this about the album:  Monsters of Legend is Midnight Syndicate's tribute to the classic horror films (especially those of Universal and Hammer) that shaped horror cinema. When you listen to the album, we want you to feel like you are a character in one of those classic horror films exploring a place where mysterious townsfolk, a foreboding castle up the cliffs, and any one of the iconic monsters could be lurking right around the corner. The music (which has a very Hammeresque and Herrmannesque feel to it) is blended with sound effects to make you feel like you are right there... especially with headphones (on) or in a quiet room.

In addition to the sixteen new tracks on the album, were five previously released tracks that were given new arrangements and additional material by Edward Douglas. The most notable additions to the old tracks were voice actor, Dick Terhune performing on a new arrangement of the song, Requiem and vocalist Amber Foth (also featured on Carnival Arcane) performing on a new version of Twilight.

Reception
Monsters of Legend received favorable reviews from many horror film bloggers like Theofantastique and Mr. Frights, role-playing game-related publications like Black Gate and Games Gazette, and amusement park sites like, Behind the Thrills. Mr. Dark of the horror website, Dread Central, wrote that: "This is what Midnight Syndicate does best: dark, goth instrumental orchestrations that fit a general theme and provide an excellent mental backdrop to all things horror." Aaron Von Lupton of Rue Morgue Magazine it "mood music for horror fans." Music reviewer, Elise Din, of Side-Line Music Magazine and Halloween and home haunt YouTuber Dave Dankanyin called it the band's best work yet.  FEARnet included the album in its Best of 2013: Top 13 Horror-Friendly albums of 2013.

In May 2014, Monsters of Legend won the Best Horror CD category in the 12th annual Rondo Hatton Classic Horror Awards. The album was nominated for Best RPG Related Product in the 2014 ENnie Awards in the role-playing game industry.

Track listing

Personnel 
Edward Douglas – composer
Gavin Goszka – composer
Dick Terhune - voice actor on Requiem, Unwanted Visitor

Production 
Producers – Edward Douglas, Gavin Goszka
Mastering – Gavin Goszka
Cover art and Design - Brainstorm Design Group
Band Photography - Beki Ingram, David Henson Greathouse
Band Photography Design - Topher Adam
Arcacia Photography - Mark Rakocy

Release History 
Entity Productions MS1016-CD (July 19, 2013): First CD issue
Entity Productions MS1016-LP (July 19, 2013): First Vinyl issue (250, limited edition, hand-numbered)

References

2013 albums
Midnight Syndicate albums